Christopher Catherwood,  (born 1 March 1955) is a British author based in Cambridge, England and, often, in Richmond, Virginia. He has taught for the Institute of Continuing Education based a few miles away in Madingley and has taught for many years for the School of Continuing Education at the University of Richmond. He has been associated each summer with the University of Richmond's History Department, where he is its annual summer Writer in Residence, and where most of his recent books have been written.

History

He is the son of Sir Fred Catherwood. He was educated at Westminster School, Balliol College, Oxford, Sidney Sussex College, Cambridge, and the University of East Anglia where he obtained a PhD degree by publication. Since 1994 he has been linked to St Edmund's College, Cambridge.

In 2001, he was a Rockefeller Fellow at the University of Virginia's Virginia Foundation for the Humanities and Public Policy, and in 2002 was briefly a consultant to the British Cabinet Office's former Strategic Futures Team of their Performance and Innovation Unit.

In 2002, he was a consultant to the Strategic Futures Team of British Prime Minister Tony Blair.

He has been a Fellow of the Royal Geographical Society (FRGS) and a Fellow of the Royal Asiatic Society (FRAS). For his religious and historical non-fiction work he was elected a Fellow of the Royal Historical Society (FRHistS) in 2005.

In December 2008, he appeared as a cameo character in the online novel Corduroy Mansions by Alexander McCall Smith, who wrote a positive review of his book on Churchill's creation of Iraq in The New York Times.

In 2008, he was a Crosby Kemper Memorial Lecturer at the Churchill Memorial and Library, Westminster College in Fulton, MO.

In 2009, he was a Marshall Lecturer at the George C. Marshall Center at the Virginia Military Institute. In the same year he was also an Osher Lecturer at the University of Richmond, VA.

In 2010, he was a Winston Churchill Memorial Trust Traveling Fellow (at the Evelyn Waugh Archives at the Harry Ransom Center at UT Austin, at the Fitzroy Maclean Archives at the Alderman Library at the University of Virginia, and at the OSS Archives at the National Archives in College Park MD).

In 2010, he again appeared as a cameo character in a second Alexander McCall Smith novel, The Dog Who Came in From The Cold.

He currently teaches students from Connecticut College, Tulane, Villanova, Wake Forest and other American universities in the Cambridge-based INSTEP program, teaching 20th century history and also church history. He is a Key Supervisor for the JYA Programme at Homerton College, Cambridge. and is an SCR Associate of Churchill College, Cambridge, at which college he was the Archives By-Fellow for Lent Term 2008 for his work on Winston Churchill and the Second World War.

Family background
Christopher Catherwood is the son of Sir Frederick Catherwood (former Vice-President of the European Parliament), and maternal grandson of the preacher Dr. D. Martyn Lloyd-Jones. He was married to Paulette; a piano teacher, daughter of the late Reverend John S. Moore, for many years the editor of the Virginia Baptist Historical Register. He and Paulette are members of the evangelical Cambridge city centre Anglican church, St Andrew the Great.

Selected works
Five Evangelical Leaders (Hodder and Stoughton in the UK and for Harold Shaw in the US)
Martyn Lloyd-Jones A Family Portrait (Kingsway in the UK and Baker Book House in the US, 1995)
Why the Nations Rage (Hodder and Stoughton in the UK in 1997 and a new academic edition with Rowman & Littlefield in the US in 2002)
A Crash Course in Church History (Hodder and Stoughton in the UK 1997 and new edition in the US with Crossway 2007)
Five Leading Reformers (CFP 2000)
The Balkans in World War II (Palgrave 2003)
Christians, Muslims, and Islamic Rage (Zondervan 2003)
Churchill's Folly: How Winston Churchill Created Iraq (Carroll and Graf, in the USA 2004: called Winston's Folly with Constable in the UK in 2004)
A Brief History of the Middle East (Carroll and Graf in the US and Constable in the UK, 2006)
A God Divided (Victor, 2007)
"Making War in the Name of God" (Citadel Press, 2007)
Winston Churchill: The Flawed Genius of World War II (Penguin, New York, 2009)
His Finest Hour: A Biography of Winston Churchill (Skyhorse Publishing, New York, 2010; published in the UK by Constable and Robinson, London as His Finest Hour: A Brief Life of Winston Churchill
The Evangelicals (Crossway Books, Wheaton IL, 2010)
"The Second World War: A Beginner's Guide" (Oneworld Publications, 2014)
Martyn Lloyd-Jones: His Life and Relevance for the 21st Century. (Crossway Books, Wheaton IL, 2015)
Churchill and Tito: SOE, Bletchley Park and Supporting the Yugoslav Communists in World War II (Frontline Books. 2017)

References

1955 births
Living people
Alumni of Balliol College, Oxford
Alumni of Sidney Sussex College, Cambridge
Alumni of the University of East Anglia
English historians
Fellows of the Royal Asiatic Society
Fellows of the Royal Geographical Society
Fellows of the Royal Historical Society
People educated at Westminster School, London
People from Cambridge
Academics of the Institute of Continuing Education